China Export & Credit Insurance Corporation (commonly known as Sinosure (中国信保, Zhōngguó Xìnbǎo)) is a major Chinese state owned enterprise (SOE) under the administration of Ministry of Finance of the People's Republic of China serving as the provider of export credit insurance, in particular coverage for the export of high-value added goods in China.

History
Sinosure was established in 2001 by merging the Export Credit Insurance Department of the People's Insurance Company of China (PICC) and the export credit insurance section of the China Export and Import Bank, as part of China's accession into the WTO.  Financing since 2001 has totaled 290 billion dollars' worth of exports and investments, and 570 billion yuan of lending. In 2009 alone, the company insured 116 billion dollars' worth of exports.

In May 2011, the Chinese government decided to inject 3.1 billion dollars into Sinosure, as part of its effort to improve the commercial viability of financial institutions.

Sinosure was hit hard by a classical example of political risk in 2011, when the uprising in Libya meant it must pay insurance claims of more than 1 billion dollars by 13 SOEs which had large ongoing investments in the country.

Sinosure is a member of the Berne Union.

Products
Sinosure offers coverage against political risks, commercial and credit risks. This includes short-, medium- and long-term export credit insurance, investment insurance, bond and guarantee business, debt and capital retrieval business and credit assessment business. Investment guarantees cover political risks such as currency and remittance restrictions, expropriation and nationalization, sovereign breaches of contract and war.

Sinosure also provides support for export financing. In March 2011, it reached an agreement with J.P. Morgan to provide a wide array of financial services to exporters, with Sinosure covering J.P. Morgan's exposure.

Sinosure also covers SMEs (since 2005, even those with export volumes of under 2 million dollars a year) that are unable to bear the political and commercial risks of international trade. The company also provides coverage for foreign investment by Chinese companies, this time most often by large SOEs.

See also 
 Dai Chunning, former executive investigated for corruption

References

Financial services companies established in 2001
Insurance companies of China
Chinese companies established in 2001
Export credit agencies
Foreign trade of China
Government-owned companies of China